Guyam Island is a tear-drop shaped island in the Philippine Sea situated  southeast of Manila in the province of Surigao del Norte. It is a popular stop for tourists doing island-hopping trips.

See also

 Desert island
 List of islands

External links
 Guyam Island at OpenStreetMap

Islands of Surigao del Norte
Uninhabited islands of the Philippines
Tourist attractions in Surigao del Norte